The Embassy of Canada to Croatia in Zagreb is the diplomatic mission of Canada to Croatia. This embassy also represents Canadian diplomatic relations with Kosovo. Visas for immigration to Canada are not processed in Zagreb, as they are processed at the Visa Section of the Embassy of Canada to Austria in Vienna.

Building

The building in which the embassy is located is rented from the Serbian orthodox Metropolitanate of Zagreb and Ljubljana.

By the beginning of the War in Croatia, the building was the seat of the metropolitanate and its museum, archive and library. On April 11, 1992, the building was dynamited, after which the seat of the metropolitanate was moved to another building. After the metropolitanate restored the building, they rented it to the embassy.

References

Zagreb
Canada
Canada–Croatia relations
Donji grad, Zagreb